Antonio Graziadei, Italian politician
Billy Graziadei, owner of recording studio Firewater Studios in Los Angeles, California, current lead vocalist of American rock band Biohazard and former lead vocalist for American rock band Suicide City
Ercole Graziadei, Italian lawyer
Michael Graziadei, American actor